Greymouth Central is the central business district of Greymouth on the West Coast of New Zealand, which also contains residential housing.

The earliest street names honour pioneer residents, explorers and prominent local Māori, while others pay tribute to English literary figures and politicians. Later developments recognise the achievements of local residents who contributed significantly to civic and local body affairs.

Demographics

Greymouth Central, comprising the statistical areas of Greymouth Central and King Park, had a population of 2,031 at the 2018 New Zealand census, a decrease of 105 people (-4.9%) since the 2013 census, and a decrease of 369 people (-15.4%) since the 2006 census. There were 888 households. There were 954 males and 1,080 females, giving a sex ratio of 0.88 males per female, with 273 people (13.4%) aged under 15 years, 366 (18.0%) aged 15 to 29, 792 (39.0%) aged 30 to 64, and 597 (29.4%) aged 65 or older.

Ethnicities were 87.7% European/Pākehā, 9.0% Māori, 1.8% Pacific peoples, 6.9% Asian, and 2.4% other ethnicities (totals add to more than 100% since people could identify with multiple ethnicities).

The proportion of people born overseas was 14.0%, compared with 27.1% nationally.

Although some people objected to giving their religion, 45.2% had no religion, 42.4% were Christian, 1.2% were Hindu, 0.3% were Muslim and 1.6% had other religions.

Of those at least 15 years old, 222 (12.6%) people had a bachelor or higher degree, and 492 (28.0%) people had no formal qualifications. The employment status of those at least 15 was that 732 (41.6%) people were employed full-time, 255 (14.5%) were part-time, and 42 (2.4%) were unemployed.

Education

There are four schools in the central Greymouth area, and other schools in the suburbs or adjoining areas of Blaketown, Cobden and Karoro.

The school was formed in 1980 from the merger of Marist Brothers Boys’ School and St Mary’s High School.

Both are state integrated Catholic schools. The schools are adjacent to each other and have a shared Board of Trustees.

All these schools are co-educational. Rolls are as of 

There is also a tertiary provider. Tai Poutini Polytechnic has its head office based in Greymouth. It also has campuses in Auckland, Christchurch, Hokitika, Reefton, Wanaka and Westport.

References

Grey District
Suburbs of Greymouth
Central business districts in New Zealand
Populated places in the West Coast, New Zealand